Gol Tappeh (also known as Kal Tappeh) is a village in Sanjabad-e Gharbi Rural District, in the Central District of Kowsar County, Ardabil Province, Iran. At the 2006 census, its population was 31, in 9 families.

References 

Towns and villages in Kowsar County